Keldon may refer to:
Keldon, Michigan
Keldon, Ontario
Keldon class starship, a fictional starship
Keldon Amadiro, fictional character in Isaac Asimov's Robot series.
Keldon Johnson, American professional basketball player